Erik Dijkstra (born 9 March 1977) is a Dutch journalist and television personality.

He is known for his role as Jakhals Erik in the recurring segment De Jakhalzen in the early-evening talk show De Wereld Draait Door. In 2011, he was the narrator in the inaugural edition of The Passion. In 2018, he succeeded Kees Driehuis as presenter of the quiz show Per Seconde Wijzer.

References

External links

 

1977 births
Living people
21st-century Dutch journalists
Dutch game show hosts